Hsieh Chia-han (born 14 January 1988) is a Taiwanese pole vaulter. He was the gold medallist at the Asian Indoor Athletics Championships in 2014.

At the 2009 Universiade he did not get past the qualifying stages. He was a finalist at the 2009 Asian Athletics Championships (coming eighth) and took the bronze medal at the 2009 East Asian Games.

He won four consecutive national titles from 2010 to 2013. He was the seventh-place finisher at the 2011 Asian Athletics Championships and improved to fifth place at the 2013 Asian Athletics Championships two years later. He improved the national record by a further centimetre in April 2013, but failed to return to the podium at the 2013 East Asian Games, where he was fourth overall.

He began his 2014 season in the United States and cleared  indoors at the Pole Vault Summit in Reno, Nevada. He followed this national indoor record with a win at the 2014 Asian Indoor Athletics Championships.

References

External links

Living people
1988 births
Taiwanese male pole vaulters
Athletes (track and field) at the 2010 Asian Games
Athletes (track and field) at the 2014 Asian Games
Asian Games competitors for Chinese Taipei